Danilo Mijatović (born August 6, 1983) is a Serbian professional basketball player for Star of the Second League of Serbia.

References

External links
 Danilo Mijatović at aba-liga.com
 Danilo Mijatović at eurobasket.com
 Danilo Mijatović at fiba.com
 

1983 births
Living people
ABA League players
Basketball League of Serbia players
European champions for Serbia
KK Lions/Swisslion Vršac players
KK MZT Skopje players
KK Novi Sad players
KK Radnički Kragujevac (2009–2014) players
KK Spartak Subotica players
KK Star players
KK Włocławek players
OKK Vrbas players
People from Vrbas, Serbia
Power forwards (basketball)
Serbian expatriate basketball people in Poland
Serbian expatriate basketball people in North Macedonia
Serbian expatriate basketball people in Romania
Serbian men's basketball players
Serbian men's 3x3 basketball players